AlHiwar (Arabic: الحوار) is an Arabic language satellite TV channel broadcasting from London.

AlHiwar (meaning "Dialogue" in Arabic) presents a set of talk-show and analysis-style TV programs, dealing with political, social and economic issues related to the Arab citizen, as well as issues related to migrants' lives and Muslim communities in the West. It also aims to highlight the value of dialogue.

History
Al-Hiwar was founded in 2006; its founding managing editor is Azzam Al-Tamimi.

Its Goals 
AlHiwar is an Arab media service that seeks to contribute to building a better tomorrow for Arab societies. The TV channel reflects the importance of dialogue between individuals and societies as a basic means of communication, understanding and building bridges of understanding.

Its Vision 

According to AlHiwar Facebook page, the TV channel is an Arab media service that seeks to contribute to building a better tomorrow for Arab societies. It is the voice of Arabs in the diaspora, a bridge of communication between Arabs and other peoples and cultures, and a platform for promoting the values of tolerance, democracy and respect for freedoms and human rights.

It is a means of communication between Arabic speakers everywhere. It also raises the slogan that dialogue has endless dimensions, as it is required between the different generations, societies, individuals, politicians and societies.

AlHiwar is concerned with the interaction between the Arab communities in the diaspora in order to better address the concerns and difficulties they face in the diaspora. It is a means of integrating the Arab communities within their new societies in an active and positive manner without blurring their original identity and values.

AlHiwar is an Arabic-language television channel, as it is directed to Arabs, whether in the Arab world or in the diaspora. It is a means of convergence of opinions based on reviewing what is presented, with the aim of discovering others within the principle of coexistence in the Arab world.

It is a tool for communication between Arabs and their new societies to introduce their cultural values, to activate their positive role in public life in their new homes, and to serve the aspirations of the Arab peoples in building positive relations with these societies and creating a greater understanding of Arab issues.

It is also a platform for interaction between the Arab communities and their motherland, helping them contribute to construction, reform, development, positive transfer of expertise and experiences, and change for the better. It is an Arabic-language television channel, meaning that most of its programs are in Arabic.

Programs

 Revisions (Arabic: مراجعات)

Is a series of dialogues in which Dr. Azzam Al-Tamimi hosts a group of Arab figures from different political backgrounds, where they shed light on their contributions to major events witnessed by the Arab and Islamic world and share their experience.

 Highlights of Events (Arabic: أضواء على الأحداث)

Is a daily TV program that analyses the most important Arab and international events. It hosts experts and analysts from different regions of the world who go deeper into the news and developments. It mainly focuses on issues related to the Arab citizen, including economic, political and social issues.

 The Free Opinion (Arabic: الرأي الحر)

Is a daily 2-hour interactive program. It provides the viewer with a platform to express his opinion on current issues that concern the daily life of the Arab citizen.

 London Dialogue (Arabic: حوار لندن)

Is an interactive weekly program which has no presenter, but different attendees, who discuss the most important issues that have passed over the week, in an open and interactive manner that makes the discussion move swiftly between the guests without prior preparation.

Al Hiwar’s registered address is in the Westgate House which has been accused of serving as a hub for Muslim Brotherhood and Hamas operations in Western Europe.

Censorship attempts
The TV station was the target of several censorship attempts; in May 2009, it was taken off Hotbird after repeated and deliberate jamming of its signals. This happened while the channel was airing interviews with exiled Libyan opposition leaders.

Egypt

Al-Hiwar was unexpectedly taken off Egyptian-owned satellite operator Nilesat in April 2008. This move came just weeks after the signing of the so-called "Principles for Regulating Satellite TV in the Arab World" which was adopted unanimously by the Arab League during a meeting in Cairo on February 12, 2008. However, the Egyptian authorities and Nilesat denied that the new charter on Arab media had anything to do with this.

The United Arab Emirates

In June 2008, Emirati authorities seized tapes and recordings of Al-Hiwar journalists in Dubai Airport, who were leaving for London after they had filmed an episode of "Khaleeji Dimensions" that deals with the national identity in the United Arab Emirates. The material seized was later sent to Al-Hiwar headquarters in London and the original airing schedule for the episode was postponed.

Broadcasting
HD

High-definition (HD) broadcasting was started in January 2017 via satellite using Hot Bird 13B and in October 2018 (HD) started on Nilesat.

References

External links
Al-Hiwar official website
Official Youtube Channel

Arab mass media
Arabic-language television stations
Foreign television channels broadcasting in the United Kingdom
Arabic-language television
Television channels and stations established in 2006